Xu Shouhui (1320–1360) was a 14th-century Chinese rebel leader who proclaimed himself emperor of the Tianwan (天完) dynasty during the late Yuan dynasty period of China. He was also known as Xu Zhenyi (徐真一 or 徐真逸, romanized in Wade–Giles as Hsü Chen-i).

Born in Luotian (羅田, now in Hubei), Xu was a cloth vendor by profession.

Emperor
In August 1351, he worked with others in Qízhōu to establish the rebel army of Red Turbans under the pretense of the Buddhist White Lotus Society. In the following months of the Red Turban Rebellion, they captured Qishui and made it the command centre of the Red Turbans and the capital of the newly declared Empire of Tianwan, originally called Song with himself as the emperor with the era name of "Zhiping".

The number of his supporters increased rapidly as he claimed to be Maitreya Buddha who sought to "destroy the rich to benefit the poor". In 1352, he invaded more of Hebei, and moved on to take Jiangxi, Anhui, Fujian, Zhejiang, Jiangsu, and Hunan.

After being temporarily defeated by the army of the Yuan dynasty, he fled to Huangmei Mountain, but returned in 1355 to invade once again and move the capital to Hanyang District.

Five years later in 1360, Xu Shouhui was assassinated by his former ally, Chen Youliang, thus causing the collapse of the Tianwan Empire.

See also
Red Turban Rebellion

References

Red Turban rebels
Chinese emperors
Generals from Hubei
People from Huanggang
Yuan dynasty people
14th-century Chinese people
14th-century births
1360 deaths
Year of birth unknown
Founding monarchs